The 2002–03 ULEB Cup Semi finals basketball statistics are here. The 2002–03 ULEB Cup was the inaugural season of Europe's secondary level professional club basketball tournament, the ULEB Cup, which is organised by Euroleague Basketball.

Semifinal 1

Semifinal 2

See also
2002–03 in Spanish basketball

References

Semi-finals
2002–03 in Spanish basketball
2002–03 in Slovenian basketball